Tokitsuumi Masahiro (born November 8, 1973 as Masahiro Sakamoto) is a former professional sumo wrestler from Fukue, Nagasaki, Japan. A former amateur sumo champion, he turned professional in 1996. His highest rank was maegashira 3. He became the head coach of Tokitsukaze stable in 2007 following the dismissal of the previous stablemaster. He was asked to retire by the Japan Sumo Association in February 2021 for violating COVID-19 safety protocols.

Early life
With influence from his father, Tokitsuumi participated in sumo competitions from the age of three, and after a stint with judo in junior high school, he began practicing sumo again in high school and university.  He did very well in sumo at Tokyo University of Agriculture, but after graduating, he passed an entrance test to begin working at a printing company and was planning to have a career with them.  But, his father, after seeing his continued success in amateur sumo, suggested he try his hand at professional sumo.  Soon afterwards, he was recruited by the former ōzeki Yutakayama, a fellow Tokyo University of Agriculture graduate, and joined his Tokitsukaze stable. He made his debut in March 1996 at the age of 22.

Career
After joining at the bottom of the third makushita division, Tokitsuumi took just over a year to reach the elite sekitori ranks, making the second highest jūryō division in May 1997. He won the jūryō division championship at his first attempt with a 12-3 record, but then fell flat with a 5-10 mark in the next tournament. In July 1998 he produced a 10-5 score at the rank of jūryō 2 and was promoted to the top makuuchi division for September.

Tokitsuumi had a long career in the top makuuchi division. His four special prizes for Technique were evidence of his ability, but he always struggled when promoted above the mid-level maegashira ranks. He never reached a san'yaku rank, his highest rank being maegashira 3. A poor result in 2005 took him down to jūryō but he immediately recovered his position in top division by winning the jūryō championship for the second time in July 2005. His best score in the top division was a 12-3 result in January 2006. Just two tournaments later he suffered an injury which took him down to jūryō once again, and it took him three tournaments to get back. However he showed few signs of slowing down, comfortably holding his own in the lower maegashira ranks in 2007.

Fighting style
Tokitsuumi was a yotsu-sumo wrestler who preferred fighting on the mawashi to pushing or thrusting. His favoured grip was migi-yotsu, with his left hand outside and right hand inside his opponent's arms. He won over 40 per cent of his matches by yori-kiri, or force out.  He was also fond of shitatenage, or underarm throw.

Retirement
On October 9, 2007, he suddenly retired from being an active sumo wrestler and became head coach of Tokitsukaze stable, after the previous head coach (former komusubi Futatsuryū) was dismissed by the Japan Sumo Association for his involvement in a hazing scandal. He was initially reluctant to do so, having not yet reached san'yaku, but was persuaded by the former Yutakayama, who had always regarded him as his preferred successor. He was a popular choice among his fellow wrestlers.

In a highly unusual move, the banzuke (or ranking sheet) for the November 2007 tournament contained a blank space in the rank where Tokitsuumi's name ought to have appeared (West maegashira 11). Ordinarily, when a wrestler retires he does not succeed immediately as a head coach and owner of a stable. In this case, due to the unusual nature of the dismissal of the previous Tokitsukaze stablemaster, he acquired both the stable and toshiyori-kabu (coaching license) for the Tokitsukaze name immediately on retirement. Had his name remained on the banzuke he would therefore have been listed twice. The blank space was left to avoid the confusion in the rankings that would otherwise result. The last time a comparable situation occurred was in 1873, when two wrestlers were expelled from professional sumo as agitators. They formed a new organization (the modern Takasago stable). On that occasion, their names were blotted out of the banzuke with ink.

His official retirement ceremony, or danpatsu-shiki, took place at the Ryōgoku Kokugikan on October 5, 2008.

In June 2010 he faced censure for his involvement in the gambling scandal rocking the sumo world, after it was revealed that he had illegally bet on baseball while still an active wrestler. On July 4 he was demoted to the lowest toshiyori level on the elder hierarchy, with no opportunity for re-promotion for at least five years.

Tokitsukaze has produced the top division wrestlers Tosayutaka, Shōdai and Yutakayama.

Tokitsuumi was told not to leave his house and prevented from attending the September 2020 tournament after he breached the Sumo Association's COVID-19 guidelines by travelling to another prefecture. In the same month he was unable to take part in the ceremony marking Shōdai's promotion to ōzeki, despite having been given permission to do so, due to an acute illness. He was demoted from iin level to the lowest toshiyori level by the Sumo Association on October 1. During his trip he had engaged in several non-essential activities such as eating out, playing golf and visiting his home town of Gotō, Nagasaki.

In January 2021 the Sumo Association said it was again investigating Tokitsuumi for possible COVID-19 safety protocol violations, after he was reported to have visited a mahjong parlor. The Sumo Association formally requested Tokitsuumi's retirement on 22 February, which he accepted.

Family
His sons, Hirokazu and Shoma, joined professional sumo in May 2021 after graduating from high school. They were initially scheduled to join Tokitsukaze stable, but following their father's resignation joined Tatsunami stable. Hirokazu and Shoma took the shikona Kiryuko and Shunrai respectively.

Career record

See also
Glossary of sumo terms
List of sumo tournament second division champions
List of past sumo wrestlers
List of sumo elders

References

External links

1973 births
Living people
Japanese sumo wrestlers
Sumo people from Nagasaki Prefecture